DMTV The Lifestyle Channel for Distinguished Men. قناة الرجل المتميز
DMTV was an Arabic TV channel located in  Dubai Media City in the United Arab Emirates. It was launched on August 1, 2006 by National Broadcast Center, a private media company.

Mission:
To consistently meet the needs of the Arab men, by offering programming that meets the demands of his lifestyle.

Company Overview:
DMTV will be the reference for men seeking insight into topics, such as global economics, business, and enterprise, as well as lifestyle matters, such as travel, gadgets, fashion, sports, health, fitness and entertainment.

DMTV was available on:

Nilesat 102
Frequency: 12226
Polarization: H
FEC: 3/4

Du \\ Channel # 206
E-Vision \\ Channel # 156
OSN \\ Channel #745

The channel shut down without any warning on March 30, 2015.

External links 
  DMTV (Official website)

See also 
 Dubai Media City

Television channels and stations established in 2006
Television channels and stations disestablished in 2015
Arabic-language television stations
Television stations in the United Arab Emirates
Men's mass media
Men's interest channels